Saviranna (Estonian for "Clay Beach") is a village in Jõelähtme Parish, Harju County, in northern Estonia. Saviranna has a population of 53 (as of 1 January 2010)

Saviranna village was reestablished on 19 April 2010 by detaching the land from Kallavere village.

References

External links
Photoset of Saviranna village

Villages in Harju County